Joyce Odhiambo (born 29 June 1963) is a Kenyan sprinter. She competed in the women's 100 metres at the 1988 Summer Olympics.

References

External links
 

1963 births
Living people
Athletes (track and field) at the 1988 Summer Olympics
Kenyan female sprinters
Olympic athletes of Kenya
Athletes (track and field) at the 1982 Commonwealth Games
Commonwealth Games competitors for Kenya
Place of birth missing (living people)
Olympic female sprinters